Taishin may refer to:

Taishin Financial Holdings, a Taiwanese financial services company
Taishin International Bank, a Taiwanese bank
Taishin (given name), a masculine Japanese given name
Taishin, Fukushima, a former village in Nishishirakawa District, Fukushima Prefecture, Japan